Woodland Hills Academy may refer to
 Woodland Hills Academy (Pennsylvania)
 Woodland Hills Academy (Mississippi)